The 2013–14 Meralco Bolts season was the fourth season of the franchise in the Philippine Basketball Association (PBA).

Key dates
November 3: The 2013 PBA Draft took place in Midtown Atrium, Robinson Place Manila.

Draft picks

Roster

Philippine Cup

Eliminations

Standings

Game log

 
|- bgcolor="#edbebf" 
| 1
|  November 17
|  Talk 'N Text
|  80–89
|  David (26)
|  Dillinger (9)
|  Cortez (7)
|  Cebu Coliseum
|  0–1
|  Boxscore
|- bgcolor="#edbebf" 
| 2
|  November 22
|  Rain or Shine
|  89–94
|  David (24)
|  Hodge (10)
|  Cortez (6)
|  Cuneta Astrodome
|   0–2
|  Boxscore
|- bgcolor="#bbffbb" 
| 3
|  November 27
|  Air21
|  112–79
|  Wilson (26)
|  Al-Hussaini (10)
|  Cortez (6)
|  Smart Araneta Coliseum
|  1–2
|  Boxscore
|-

|-
| 4
|  December 3
|  Ginebra
|  
|  
|  
|  
|  Mall of Asia Arena
|  
|  
|- bgcolor=
| 5
|  December 6
|  GlobalPort
|  
|  
|  
|  
|  Smart Araneta Coliseum
|  
|  
|- bgcolor=
| 6
|  December 11
|  San Mig Coffee
|  
|  
|  
|  
|  Smart Araneta Coliseum
|  
|  
|- bgcolor=
| 7
|  December 14
|  Petron Blaze
|  
|  
|  
|  
|  Dipolog
|  
|  
|- bgcolor=
| 8
|  December 18
|  Alaska
|  
|  
|  
|  
|  Mall of Asia Arena
|  
|  
|- bgcolor=
| 9
|  December 22
|  Barako Bull
|  
|  
|  
|  
|  Mall of Asia Arena
|  
|  
|- bgcolor=
| 10
|  December 28
|  Ginebra
|  
|  
|  
|  
|  Mall of Asia Arena
|  
|  

|-
| 11
|  January 4
|  Air21
|  
|  
|  
|  
|  Mall of Asia Arena
|  
|  
|- bgcolor=
| 12
|  January 10
|  Alaska
|  
|  
|  
|  
|  Smart Araneta Coliseum
|  
|  
|- bgcolor=
| 13
|  January 15
|  Rain or Shine
|  
|  
|  
|  
|  Smart Araneta Coliseum
|  
|  
|- bgcolor=
| 14
|  January 18
|  Petron Blaze
|  
|  
|  
|  
|  Smart Araneta Coliseum
|  
|  
|-

Playoffs

Bracket

Commissioner's Cup

Eliminations

Standings

Game log

Playoffs

Bracket

Governors' Cup

Eliminations

Standings

Transactions

Overview

Trades

Pre-season

Recruited imports

References

Meralco Bolts seasons
Meralco